Lolium persicum is a species of flowering plant in the family Poaceae. It is referred to by the common names Persian darnel or Persian ryegrass, and is an annual grass. It has an upright stem, branching from a reddish base, up to 45 cm tall. Its leaves are lower surface glossy, dark green, 6 mm wide.

References

External links

Pooideae
Taxa named by Pierre Edmond Boissier
Taxa named by Rudolph Friedrich Hohenacker